The Father in Primitive Psychology is a 1927 book by Polish anthropologist Bronisław Malinowski, describing the role of the father in the family of the  Trobriand islanders.

References

External links
 Full text of The Father in Primitive Psychology at HathiTrust Digital Library

1927 non-fiction books
Anthropology books
Works by Bronisław Malinowski
Books about Oceania
Trobriand Islands
Fatherhood